The 2009 IPC Swimming World Championships 25 m were held from 29 November – 5 December in Rio de Janeiro, Brazil. It was the first ever world-level short course paralympic swimming competition organised by the International Paralympic Committee (IPC).

Medal table

Medalists

Men's events

Legend: WR – World record

Women's events

Legend: WR – World record

Participating nations
Competitors representing thirty-one National Paralympic Committees (NPCs) attended the championships.

See also
2009 in swimming
Swimming at the 2008 Summer Paralympics
2010 IPC Swimming World Championships
List of IPC world records in swimming

References

External links
2009 IPC Swimming World Championships 25 m

World Para Swimming Championships
IPC World Championships
Swimming
International sports competitions in Rio de Janeiro (city)
2000s in Rio de Janeiro